The Orangeville A's were a Canadian professional basketball franchise based in Orangeville, Ontario.  Founded in 2012 in Brampton, the A's were a member of the National Basketball League of Canada, where they began play for the  season.

History
The Brampton A's colour scheme would be red and black.

On September 15, 2015, the A's decided to relocate to Orangeville, Ontario.

After the 2016–17 season the A's folded.

Home arenas
Originally opened in 1998, the Powerade Centre is a 5,000-seat multi-purpose arena in Brampton, Ontario. The main arena has a capacity of 5,000. The A's share the arena with the Brampton Beast of the ECHL. It is also home to the Brampton Inferno, Peel Avengers, and Brampton Excelsiors lacrosse teams.

On September 15, 2015, the A's announced that they would be relocating to Orangeville and begin playing at the Athlete Institute in Mono, Ontario. The team declined the option to remain at the Powerade Centre for five more years. The A's would not have to pay rental fees for modifying the court, as they were forced to do in their old arena. Team owner James Tipping said, "I had to do what was best for the team and NBL Canada. I chose to do what best for the franchise and NBL Canada."

Final roster

Season-by-season record

References

External links
 

 
Basketball teams in Ontario
Sport in Orangeville, Ontario
Basketball teams established in 2013
2013 establishments in Ontario
Defunct National Basketball League of Canada teams
Basketball teams disestablished in 2017
2017 disestablishments in Ontario